McCormick House  may refer to 

McCormick House (Trinidad, Colorado), listed on the National Register of Historic Places in Las Animas County, Colorado
McCormick House (Washington, D.C.), the residence of the Brazilian ambassador to the United States